Amherst Airport  is an abandoned airport that was located  west of Amherst, Nova Scotia, Canada. It was a small turf airstrip, located perpendicular to Highway 104 opposite the Amherst Industrial Park.

History

Aerodrome
The field was listed as "turf" and had one runway listed as follows:

Current
The airport was listed as abandoned as of 8 June 2006.

References

Defunct airports in Nova Scotia
Amherst, Nova Scotia